Raasi (born Vijaya) is an Indian actress who predominantly appeared in Telugu and Tamil films. She is credited as Manthra in Malayalam and Tamil films. She appeared in films such as Subhakankshalu (1997), Gokulamlo Seeta (1997) and Pelli Pandiri (1998). In 2020, she made her debuted in television with Telugu soap operas Girija Kalyanam (2020 -21) and Janaki Kalaganaledu (2021).

Personal life
Raasi was born as Vijaya on 1976 in West Godavari district, Andhra Pradesh, India. She married film director Sri Muni.

Film career 
At the age of 10, she started acting as a child actress in the 1986 Telugu film, Mamatala Kovella (1986).

She also worked in the Hindi movies Rangbaaz (1996), Jodidar (1997) and Suraj (1997) with Mithun Chakraborty.

In Telugu, Raasi rose to fame with Subhakankshalu (1997). She was labelled "traditional" after Gokulamlo Seeta (1997). Later, hits like Snehithulu (1998), Pandaga (1998), Gilli Kajjalu (1998), Devullu (2000) and proved her mettle as an actress. When Raasi's career started taking a nosedive, she took to doing item numbers in Telugu films like Samudram (1999).

She debuted her first Tamil film Priyam. Following a prolific year 1996, she received offers including the Vijay-starrer Love Today (1997) and the Ajith Kumar-starrer Rettai Jadai Vayasu (1997). A further opportunity to work with T. Rajender in a project titled Ilam Kaadhalargal, however failed to materialise despite production work taking place. Some of her other movies in Tamil are  Periya Idathu Mappillai (1997), Ganga Gowri (1997), Thedinen Vanthathu (1997),  Kondattam (1998), Kalyana Galatta (1998), Pudhu Kudithanam (1999), Kannan Varuvaan (2000), Kuberan (2000) and Simmasanam (2000).

She played a negative character in Telugu movie Nijam (2003), which was directed by Teja.

After her marriage, she took a break from acting and made a comeback in character roles.

Filmography

Film

Television
 Girija Kalyanam (2020-2021) on Gemini TV
 Janaki Kalaganaledu (2021–present) on Star Maa

References

External links 
 

Indian film actresses
Living people
Actresses in Tamil cinema
Actresses in Telugu cinema
Actresses in Kannada cinema
Actresses in Malayalam cinema
20th-century Indian actresses
21st-century Indian actresses
Child actresses in Telugu cinema
Child actresses in Malayalam cinema
Child actresses in Tamil cinema
Actresses from Andhra Pradesh
People from West Godavari district
1978 births